Mushroom Lake is a small alpine lake in Custer County, Idaho, United States, located in the Sawtooth Mountains in the Sawtooth National Recreation Area.  There are no trails leading to the lake, although it is most easily accessed from Sawtooth National Forest trail 092.

Mushroom Lake is in the Sawtooth Wilderness, and a wilderness permit can be obtained at a registration box at trailheads or wilderness boundaries.  Hell Roaring Lake and Imogene Lake are downstream of Mushroom Lake.

See also
 List of lakes of the Sawtooth Mountains (Idaho)
 Sawtooth National Recreation Area

References

Lakes of Idaho
Lakes of Custer County, Idaho
Glacial lakes of the United States
Glacial lakes of the Sawtooth Wilderness